The Opel Rekord D series is an executive car that replaced the Rekord C on Opel's Rüsselsheim production lines during the closing weeks of 1971 and launched on the West German market at the start of 1972. It shared its wheelbase and inherited most of its engines from its predecessor, but the bodies were completely new. Also new, announced in September 1972, was the option of a diesel powered Opel Rekord. Early advertising and press material called the new car the "Opel Rekord II" but in due course, the "Rekord II" appellation was quietly dropped and the Rekord D was replaced at the end of the 1977 summer holiday shut down by the Opel Rekord E.

The Rekord D's 5½ year production run was longer than that of any previous generation of Opel Rekord: during that period 1,128,196 were produced. It was the second Opel Rekord to exceed the million mark, although its final year saw a marked decrease in demand, as the car was challenged from below after 1975 by the second generation Opel Ascona. By now the increases in fuel prices were encouraging middle market customers to downsize, at a time when the Opel Rekord had, over the years, grown to occupy a market slot at the top end of the "medium-sized" category in northern Europe, being already seen as a "large" family car in Italy and France.

Various cars based on the Rekord D were also built at General Motors plants outside West Germany, both within and beyond Europe.

The car
The car that appeared at the end of December 1971 featured an all-new body styled by Chuck Jordan. The Rekord C's "coke-bottle" style was not repeated, but the new car, with its larger glass area, did introduce a discrete tribute to the Hofmeister kink, a styling cue which had identified BMW cars for ten years. The Rekord D was close in form to the Vauxhall Victor "Transcontinental" launched three months later by Opel's sister company in England. In fact none of the exterior body panels were the same, but the two cars shared their principal floor panel pressings and a number of other components in places where customers would not notice them. Evidently there were close contacts between the teams at Vauxhall and Opel during the development phase. The shared design philosophy and aspirations of the European General Motors cousins are hard to gainsay, however, when the cars are viewed together.

Although the Rekord D followed the Rekord C, early advertising called it, less logically, the Opel Rekord II. There was concern that incorporating the letter "D" might confuse customers in a country where "D" at the end of the name of a "Mercedes-Benz" denoted a diesel engine. At launch the Rekord D, like all previous Rekords, came only with a range of petrol/gasoline engines.

The bodies
The monocoque steel bodied cars offered seating for five. The new Rekord again came with a wide range of body types. Top seller was the saloon/sedan, available with either 2 or 4 doors. There was a "Caravan" station wagon with three or five doors. For certain export markets such as Austria Opel also offered a three-door delivery van combining the driving experience of a car with the load carrying capability of a small commercial vehicle: this was essentially identical to the station wagon except that the rear side windows were replaced with metal panels. This offered self-employed traders certain tax advantages, albeit not in West Germany itself where this variant was not offered.

In addition, a factory built Opel Rekord coupé was again offered, although the "pillarless" effect of the Rekord C coupé no longer featured, which will have made it easier to retain the rigidity of the body without unacceptable cost or weight penalties.

There was no longer any sign of the coach built cabriolet conversion that had been offered for earlier Rekords. Karl Deutsch who had provided cabriolet conversions of the Opel Rekord C ceased operations in 1971 as cabriolet conversions fell out of favour in anticipation of safety legislation in North America requiring stout, costly and inelegant roll-over bars on cabriolets.

The engines

Petrol / gasoline
Opel had introduced a new generation of petrol/gasoline engines in 1966 with the Rekord B and these were the engines that reappeared in the Rekord D. As before, the stroke length was fixed at 69.8 mm: differences in engine size were achieved by varying the cylinder bore. The engine featured an unusual Camshaft in Head (CIH) configuration. The chain-driven camshaft was positioned directly above the cylinders but this was not a conventional ohc design. The camshaft operated the valves using rocker arms because the camshaft itself was positioned too low above the cylinders to permit direct action from the camshaft on the valves ends. One reason for this may have been cosmetic. Opel's so-called "CIH" engine configuration allowed the Rekord to incorporate the low bonnet/hood lines that style-conscious product development departments called for.

Although the Rekord D shared its wheelbase with its predecessor, in other respects it respected the tendency of Opel Rekords to move slightly upmarket with each new model. The Rekord D was heavier than the Rekord C and the previous model's 1492 cc engine was no longer offered. Drivers of this "1700 S" engined Rekord had to pay for higher octane fuel, however, and there was also a price to be paid in terms of reduced fuel economy.

Customers wanting more performance from their Rekord could specify the "1900 S" engine of 1897 cc, providing a maximum power output of  supported by a 9.8:1 compression ratio and a twin chamber carburetter. Like the high compression "1700 S" unit, the "1900 S" needed high octane fuel, but it did provide a top speed of 165 km/h, making it good for more than 100 mph in non-metric export markets. This was the fastest Opel Rekord D on launch, there being no longer any six-cylinder engined Rekords. Anyone wishing to buy a Rekord bodied car with a six-cylinder engine would need to pay also for the enhanced specification of the six-cylinder Opel Commodore with which the Rekord again shared its body.

This was the only engine offered by Opel's Japanese importer.

In 1975 the Petrol/gasoline lead law came into force, more than halving the amount of lead that could be added to petrol in West Germany. Similar legislation came into effect in key export markets across western Europe. For the oil companies the addition of lead to fuel provided a simple and inexpensive way to vary octane levels. Having lobbied vigorously against the legislative restrictions, they now responded by reducing fuel octane ratings on the forecourts. The 98 octane fuel on which the Rekord's high compression engines depended was reduced in the super grade fuel normally available, while low lead 98 octane fuel became hard to find and very expensive. The "1900 S" high compression ratio version of this engine had its maximum power reduced from  reflecting a compression ratio reduced from 9.8:1 to 8.8:1, which enabled it to use the new reduced octane "super" grade fuels without knocking. In some markets, such as Sweden and Switzerland, emissions controls were even stricter and the new engine produced only , while the 1700 engine was discontinued there.

To compensate for the loss of performance on the "1900 S" Opel now increased the cylinder bores further and introduced, in September 1975, a 1979 cc version of the engine for their Rekord "2000 S".  of maximum power was claimed for what was the fastest Rekord from this generation. Neither its power nor its performance matched the "1900 H" version of the old 106 hp Opel Rekord C however, which presumably reflected changed priorities in the market place following the fuel shortages and price shocks of the mid 1970s.

Diesel
September 1972 saw the introduction of the first diesel powered Opel Rekord, with which the manufacturer launched a determined assault on the lucrative stranglehold that Mercedes-Benz enjoyed over the taxi market in West Germany and, to varying extents, in many of the export markets where the firms competed. The four cylinder 2068 cc diesel unit was not based on the Rekord's "CIH" gasoline/petrol engines, but was a newer design. The "Caravan" wagon was originally not available with the diesel engine, but a five-door diesel estate was added to the lineup at the 1973 Frankfurt Motor Show (September).

The fuel feed system employed a Bosch diesel injection pump. The unit's basic architecture applied a conventional ohc configuration which made it a little taller than the Rekord's petrol engines, and diesel powered Rekord Ds are therefore easily distinguishable by the hump shaped ridge along the centre of the bonnet/hood.

For certain export market, notably Italy, where the 2-litre engine size was a critical threshold in terms of car tax rates, a smaller diesel unit became available from December 1974. The smaller unit shared the 85 mm stroke of the 2068 cc unit, but the bore was reduced from 88 mm to 86.5 mm, giving rise to a 1998 cc overall displacement. This was a first outing for the 2-litre diesel engine which from 1978 was offered in a diesel powered version of the Opel Ascona.

Transmission
The standard transmission package for the saloon/sedan and estate/station wagon bodied Rekord Ds featured a manual all-synchromesh four-speed gearbox, controlled on the early versions by a column mounted lever. A centrally positioned floor-mounted gear lever, marketed as a "Sportschaltung" (sports gear change) was available from the start on petrol fueled cars, initially as an optional extra and later as a standard feature.

Buyers of all but the smallest engined cars could also specify a three-speed automatic transmission. The system used was the three-speed TH180 unit from the manufacturer's new transmission plant in Strasbourg.

Suspension, steering and brakes
Steering and suspension lay-outs were based on those from the Rekord C. The front suspension employed double wishbones of unequal length with an anti-roll bar, springs and shock-absorbers. The steering used a recirculating ball system and was controlled via a collapsible steering column. At the back there was a live axle tamed with four trailing connector arms, a Panhard rod like system and an anti-roll bar, the wheels being sprung, as at the front, using "progressive rate" coil springs and shock absorbers.

The braking configuration was also essentially that from the previous Rekord, with a dual circuit hydraulically controlled system along with the brake servo as before, with the addition, on larger engined versions, of a brake force limiter for the rear brakes. The car used disc brakes at the front and drum brakes at the back.

Trims and markets
For the Rekord D, various different packages of trims and options were offered. There was a "base" Rekord, a luxury version branded as the "Rekord L" and a "Rekord Sprint" with more sporting trim that included a matt black front grill and equipment that included several additional dials such as a rev counter. 1975 saw the introduction in of the "Rekord Berlina" which offered a still more opulent level of comfort and equipment.

When, after less than four years, production of the Rekord D reached a million in 1976, the manufacturer celebrated the achievement by offering a special edition "Rekord Millionär" in September 1976. Other special editions included the "Rekord Maharadscha", the "Rekord Hit" and the "Rekord Sport".

The Rekord was sold in most European markets and also farther afield, not only through the license built versions. Many markets received local tax specials, such as the windowless vans offered in Austria and several other markets. Italy received a sub-2 liter version of the diesel engine introduced in December 1974. Japanese buyers received only the 1900 S engine although they could choose between the four-door sedan, two-door coupé, or a sporting SR coupé with a matte black bonnet and full instrumentation. The automatic transmission was optional, as was right-hand drive.

Commercial
The Opel Rekord D received a warm welcome in the market place at the end of 1971, described by some as "the best BMW ever to come out of Hessen" ("Es galt als bester BMW, der je aus Hessen kam") on account of a style and dynamic qualities worthy of a BMW (made in Bavaria) rather than an Opel (made in Hessen). But since this was an Opel the price was competitive:  competing models such as the Volkswagen 411 were seen as having somehow missed the mark by comparison. With 1,128,196 cars sold in slightly more than 5½ years, the Rekord D was the second Opel Rekord to beat a million units. The million units target was in fact breached in the late summer of 1976: The Rekord D nevertheless sold at a slightly slower rate than its predecessor, and sales slowed towards the end of its production run.

The oil crisis of 1973 had a lasting impact on European sales of larger cars as customers perceived that the "era of (relatively) cheap fuel" was gone for ever. In 1975 Opel introduced a second generation of their Opel Ascona, half a class smaller than the Rekord, and home grown competition in Opel's showrooms came from the Ascona which can be seen as the Rekord's deadliest competitor during the second half of the 1970s. Among cars closer in size to its own class the Audi 100, introduced in 1968 but with initial availability hampered by shortage of production capacity, also became an increasingly formidable competitor for the Opel Rekord as the decade advanced.

Technical data

GM derivatives

Ranger
The Ranger was a sedan assembled in small quantities by GM at their plants in Antwerp from 1968 and in Biel from 1970. There were two Rangers built in Europe, the first of which shared most of its panels and many of its underpinnings along, in Europe, with its engines with the Rüsselsheim built Opel Rekord C.

The second Ranger replaced the first in 1972 and was closely based on Rüsselsheim's Opel Rekord D. This second Ranger, known as the Ranger B, was built only at the Antwerp plant. It was first shown alongside the Rekord D at the 1972 Geneva Salon. It was available with the 1697 cc (83 hp) or 1897 cc (97 hp) four-cylinder engines from the Rekord, or two versions of the 2.5 litre six-cylinder engines as fitted to the Rekord's more luxurious sibling, the Opel Commodore. The Ranger B had twin headlights in place of the Rekord/Commodore's single rectangular lights, repositioned front direction indicators and a reworked front grill with a horizontal bar. There was a stylish raised section on the bonnet/hood which was different from the one used on diesel-engined Rekords, and the rear panel also incorporates detail differences. The Rangers were not strikingly more expensive than equivalently powered Rekords and Commodores, but nor were they perceived as sufficiently differentiated, and Rangers were quietly withdrawn from the showrooms by late 1975.

Chevrolets in South Africa and Iran
In South Africa, December 1972 saw the introduction of the Chevrolet 3800, and the Chevrolet 4100. In 1973 a four-cylinder 2500 version arrived, replacing the Rekord C-based Ranger. This smaller engine was a four-cylinder iteration of the 3800 straight-six. The engines were indeed sourced from Chevrolet but the cars were otherwise simply locally produced versions of the Opel Rekord D from which, apart from the engines, they differed very little. The 3800 and the 4100 differed little, with the 3800 receiving a more spartan interior with vinyl seats and without standard head rests, and with different hubcaps. As for the European Ranger, they have twin round headlights rather than the Rekord's rectangular units. Engine outputs are  respectively.

The 2500, which arrived a bit later to help replace the Firenza 2500, was also available as a station wagon.

The big Chevrolet engines necessitated a bonnet with a "power bulge", although it is wider and lower than the bulge used on the Rekord Diesel's bonnet, and they also had larger fuel tanks as petrol was subject to market controls at the time. The suspension was uprated, and used locally developed variable-rate coil springs. The six-cylinder engines were built in South Africa but had hitherto been restricted to installation in larger, Holden-sourced cars. This series was South Africa's number one seller in 1975, although it dropped to third the next year and all the way to fifteenth in 1977. Larger cars received an ever-smaller market share in South Africa as sanctions began to kick in and gas prices increased steadily. It was replaced this year by the Chevrolet Rekord, a rebadged Rekord E with a Chevrolet four-cylinder.

The Rekord D was also assembled in Iran (before the revolution) from 1974 until 1977, albeit powered by six-cylinder engines. In Iran, the car was branded as the "Chevrolet Royale" or as the "Chevrolet Iran" and was assembled by Iran General Motors.

See also
 Opel Rekord
 Opel Commodore

Sources
Werner Oswald: Deutsche Autos 1945–1975. Motorbuch Verlag, Stuttgart 1975, S. 88–93

External links 

 Opel Rekord D: Company press release celebrating the 40th anniversary of the model's introduction

Rekord D
Sedans
Station wagons
Executive cars
Rear-wheel-drive vehicles
Cars introduced in 1971
1970s cars